Solveig Pedersen (born September 6, 1965) is a former Norwegian cross-country skier who competed in the 1980s and 1990s. She won a 4 × 5 km relay silver medal at the 1992 Winter Olympics in Albertville and finished eighth in the 5 km event at those same games.

Pedersen also won a bronze in the 4 × 5 km relay at the 1991 FIS Nordic World Ski Championships and finished fourth in the 15 km event at those same games. Her best individual event was third in a 15 km event in Germany in 1991.
On club level she represented Oddersjaa SSK in Kristiansand. Her coach was Arild Jørgensen.

Cross-country skiing results
All results are sourced from the International Ski Federation (FIS).

Olympic Games
1 medal – (1 silver)

World Championships
 1 medal – (1 bronze)

World Cup

Season standings

Individual podiums

1 podium

Team podiums

 4 victories 
 9 podiums 

Note:   Until the 1999 World Championships and the 1994 Olympics, World Championship and Olympic races were included in the World Cup scoring system.

References

External links
 
 
 

1965 births
Living people
Norwegian female cross-country skiers
Olympic cross-country skiers of Norway
Olympic silver medalists for Norway
Cross-country skiers at the 1992 Winter Olympics
Olympic medalists in cross-country skiing
FIS Nordic World Ski Championships medalists in cross-country skiing
Medalists at the 1992 Winter Olympics
Skiers from Oslo